McGerr is a surname. Notable people with the surname include:

Jason McGerr (born 1974), American musician
Michael McGerr, American academic and historian
Patricia McGerr (1917–1985), American crime writer

See also
McGirr